RV Oceania, or SY Oceania, is a tall ship, owned by the Polish Academy of Sciences, and used as a research vessel.

She was built in 1985 in the Gdańsk Shipyard in Poland, after the design of Zygmunt Choreń.  The hull was based on plans of earlier tall ships: ORP Iskra II and Pogoria, but its rigging was different. Oceania was originally a full-rigged ship, with three masts (each 32 metres high). On every mast there was only one sail, in the shape of a vertical rectangle (sometimes Oceania was classified as a frigate), but later the yards and the sail from the mizzen-mast were removed.  Sails are raised and driven hydraulically.

The ship is equipped with laboratories able to provide hydrographic, optic, acoustic, chemical, biological and particulate experiments and observations.

External links
 Official page of RV Oceania

Tall ships of Poland
Research vessels of Poland
1985 ships
Ships built in Gdańsk